Fandangos in Space is the 1973 debut album by flamenco-rock band Carmen.

Reception
Rock critic Ryan Reed has described their music as flamenco prog rock, "In a glammy yelp, the frontman sang tales of bullfights and gypsies, as the music blended Mellotron, rock rhythms, and zapateado footwork into a cosmic headfuck (produced by David Bowie collaborator Tony Visconti)."

Track listing

Personnel
Carmen
David Clark Allen - lead vocals, electric guitar, flamenco guitar
Roberto Amaral - lead and backing vocals, vibraphone, castanets
Angela Allen - lead and backing vocals, synthesizer, Mellotron
John Glascock - backing vocals, bass guitar, bass pedals
Paul Fenton - drums, percussion

Additional Personnel
Tony Visconti - producer, engineer
 John Kongos - engineer
 Alan Harris - engineer
 John Kurlander - engineer
 Peter Mew - engineer
 Peter Howe - photography

References

External links
 CARMEN Discography

1973 debut albums
Carmen (band) albums
Albums produced by Tony Visconti